Scolopendra calcarata is a species of centipede in the family Scolopendridae discovered in 1876.

References

calcarata
Arthropods of Asia
Arthropods of Laos
Animals described in 1876